The Lehi Commercial and Savings Bank-Lehi Hospital was a historic building in Lehi, Utah, USA. Located at 206 E. State St. in Lehi, Utah, it was built in 1891 to serve the Lehi Commercial and Savings Bank, which has also been known as the Utah Banking Company. It was built by Charles Ohran, a local mason. The building was modified in 1925 to accommodate a hospital on the second floor, which expanded downstairs in 1929. It was renovated further in 1937.

The building housed a number of other businesses in the 20th century, including Utah Sugar Company offices, a photography studio and a school. A few people even lived in a small apartment in the 1970s. After the building was vacated in 1989, it fell into severe disrepair and was the subject of many discussions by local government and preservationists. It was listed on the National Register of Historic Places in 1998. It had long been rumored to be haunted, and the owner made it into a haunted attraction for several years to try to raise money for restoration. In 2009, the Lehi City Council decided to have the building demolished due to its dangerously deteriorated condition. It was delisted from the National Register in 2018.

References

Commercial buildings completed in 1925
Bank buildings on the National Register of Historic Places in Utah
Hospital buildings on the National Register of Historic Places in Utah
Victorian architecture in Utah
Buildings and structures in Lehi, Utah
National Register of Historic Places in Utah County, Utah
Former National Register of Historic Places in Utah